Blaiklock may refer to:

People
 Catherine Blaiklock (born 1963), founder of the Brexit Party
 Edward Musgrave Blaiklock (1903–1983), chair of classics at the University of Auckland
 Ken Blaiklock (born 1927), a British Antarctic surveyor
 Michael Blaiklock, American actor and writer
 Henry Musgrave Blaiklock (1790–1843), English architect and civil engineer

Geography
 Blaiklock River, a tributary of the Barlow River in Québec, Canada
 Blaiklock Island, an island in Antarctica.
 Blaiklock Glacier, a glacier in Antarctica.

See also
 Blaiklock (surname)